Glyceronephosphate O-acyltransferase is an enzyme associated with Rhizomelic chondrodysplasia punctata type 2.

GNPAT is located on chromosome 1 on the plus strand. The gene C1orf131 is located directly upstream of it, and the closest downstream gene is EXOC8.

References

External links
 

EC 2.3.1